Philippe Petit-Radel (Paris, 7 February 1749 – 30 November 1815) was a French physician, surgeon and writer, editor of the two volumes devoted to Surgery by the Encyclopédie méthodique.

Biography
At the age of seventeen, he was awarded a Master of Arts degree and entered the Hôpital de la Charité. After obtaining a medal, he was appointed assistant major at the Invalides and continued his medical and surgical studies under the direction of Sabatier.

Appointed in 1774 as the king's surgeon-major for the French possessions in “East Indies", he held this post in Surat for three years and took the opportunity to perfect his English language skills, which later, in 1787, enabled him to publish several translations of English medical works. It was also in 1774 that he became a Freemason.

On his return to France, in 1777, he was awarded a doctorate in medicine at the University of Reims and then in Paris (1781 or 1782). He opened a private school, and for two years taught anatomy and surgery. In 1788, he obtained the chair of surgery.

He was busy writing the volumes devoted to Surgery in the Encyclopédie méthodique with Daniel de La Roche, father of François-Étienne de La Roche, when the French Revolution broke out.

At the time of the insurrection of 10 August 1792, he abruptly left the French capital and fled to Bordeaux. He was teaching public classes there, when he was conscripted (Levée en masse) as a soldier and had to fight against the insurgents in the Vendée. But he managed to escape and in June 1793 he embarked on the Pigon an American ship which had been chartered for the Isle de France (Mauritius).

After a stay in this island, he went to Bourbon Island (Réunion), and remained there for about two years, until he heard that Captain Lewis, who had brought him from Bordeaux a few years before, was in the Isle de France. He went to join him there, and sailed with him to the "Great Indies", in April 1796. From there he went to the United States of America, again stopping at the Isle de France.

Returning to France for the second time in 1797, he resumed his medical studies and literary work. In 1798, he was elected to the chair of surgical clinic at the Paris School of Medicine, where he distinguished himself by his severity and his zeal to re-establish the ancient practice of speaking Latin.

He died in 1815 from a stomach disease. He lived Rue Monsieur-le-Prince, n° 10.

Works
 Translation of The Anatomy of the Absorbing Vessels of the Human Body of William Cumberland Cruikshank (1787).
 
 
 
 
 
 Translation of

Notes

References

French surgeons
18th-century French physicians
1749 births
1815 deaths
Physicians from Paris
French Freemasons